Push and pull are concepts in supply chain management.

Push and pull or Push & Pull may also refer to:
"(Do The) Push and Pull", a 1970 soul song
Push-and-pull enteroscopy, an endoscopic technique for visualization of the small bowel
Push & Pull, a 2006 album by Blackthorn
Push & Pull, a 2009 album by Strung-Out Troubadours
"Push & Pull", a song by Nikka Costa on the 2001 album Everybody Got Their Something
"Push & Pull", a song by Twice on the 2021 album Formula of Love: O+T=<3

See also
Push to pull, compression fitting
Push–pull (disambiguation)